Toni Correia Gomes (born 16 November 1998) is a Bissau-Guinean professional footballer who plays as a forward for the Azerbaijan Premier League club Zira FK and the Guinea-Bissau national team. He also holds Portuguese citizenship and has represented Portugal at youth level.

Club career
Gomes visited his father in Lisbon, Portugal aged 15 and after a recommendation from a scout, Liverpool invited him to England for a trial in September 2014. He signed for the club in 2015; when he arrived in Liverpool he did not speak any English and was placed with house parents whilst attending Liverpool's academy.

Between 2015 and 2017 he appeared for Liverpool's Under-18 team, as well as the Under-23 teams. He ended the 2016–17 season scoring a hat-trick as Liverpool Under-23's beat Mansfield Town's Under-23 team.

On 31 August 2017 he joined Forest Green Rovers on a season-long loan, and made his Football League debut as a substitute on 2 September, playing the entire second half.

Gomes was released by Liverpool at the end of the 2017–18 season.

On 4 June 2018, Gomes signed a three-year deal with LigaPro side Arouca.

In January 2020, he moved to Egypt to join Haras El Hodoud, he later signed for Tala'ea El Gaish in November 2020.

International career
Gomes has represented Portugal at youth international level. He made his senior debut for Guinea-Bissau on 17 November 2022 in a 1-3 friendly loss to Gabon.

Career statistics

References

1998 births
Bissau-Guinean footballers
Guinea-Bissau international footballers
Bissau-Guinean expatriate footballers
Bissau-Guinean expatriate sportspeople in England
Bissau-Guinean expatriate sportspeople in Egypt
Bissau-Guinean expatriate sportspeople in Turkey
Bissau-Guinean expatriate sportspeople in Azerbaijan
Bissau-Guinean emigrants to Portugal
Naturalised citizens of Portugal
Portuguese people of Bissau-Guinean descent
Living people
Association football forwards
Portuguese footballers
Portugal youth international footballers
Liverpool F.C. players
Forest Green Rovers F.C. players
F.C. Arouca players
Haras El Hodoud SC players
Tala'ea El Gaish SC players
Menemenspor footballers
Tuzlaspor players
Zira FK players
English Football League players
Liga Portugal 2 players
Egyptian Premier League players
TFF First League players
Azerbaijan Premier League players
Portuguese expatriate footballers
Portuguese expatriate sportspeople in England
Expatriate footballers in England
Portuguese expatriate sportspeople in Egypt
Expatriate footballers in Egypt
Portuguese expatriate sportspeople in Turkey
Expatriate footballers in Turkey
Portuguese expatriate sportspeople in Azerbaijan
Expatriate footballers in Azerbaijan